The Noachis  quadrangle is one of a series of 30 quadrangle maps of Mars used by the United States Geological Survey (USGS) Astrogeology Research Program. The Noachis  quadrangle is also referred to as MC-27 (Mars Chart-27).

The Noachis quadrangle covers the area from 300° to 360° west longitude and 30° to 65° south latitude on Mars.  It lies between the two giant impact basins on Mars: Argyre and Hellas. The Noachis quadrangle includes Noachis Terra and the western part of Hellas Planitia.

Noachis is so densely covered with impact craters that it is considered among the oldest landforms on Mars—hence the term "Noachian" for one of the earliest time periods in martian history.
In addition, many previously buried craters are now coming to the surface, where Noachis' extreme age has allowed ancient craters to be filled, and once again newly exposed.

Much of the surface in Noachis quadrangle shows a scalloped topography where the disappearance of ground ice has left depressions.

The first piece of human technology to land on Mars landed (crashed) in the Noachis quadrangle. It weighed about one ton. The automated craft attempted to land in a giant dust storm. To make conditions even worse, this  area also has many dust devils.

Scalloped topography

Certain regions of Mars display scalloped-shaped depressions. The depressions are believed to be the remains of an ice-rich mantle deposit.  Scallops are created when ice sublimates from frozen soil. This mantle material probably fell from the air as ice formed on dust when the climate was different due to changes in the tilt of the Mars pole. The scallops are typically tens of meters deep and from a few hundred to a few thousand meters across.  They can be almost circular or elongated.  Some appear to have coalesced, thereby causing a large heavily pitted terrain to form.  A study published in Icarus, found that the landforms of scalloped topography can be made by the subsurface loss of water ice by sublimation under current Martian climate conditions.  Their model predicts similar shapes when the ground has large amounts of pure ice, up to many tens of meters in depth.
The process of producing the terrain may begin with sublimation from a crack because there are often polygon cracks where scallops form.

Dust Devil Tracks 

Many areas on Mars experience the passage of giant dust devils. A thin coating of fine bright dust covers most of the Martian surface. When a dust devil goes by it blows away the coating and exposes the underlying dark surface creating tracks. Dust devils have been seen from the ground and from orbit. They have even blown the dust off of the solar panels of the two Rovers on Mars, thereby greatly extending their lives. The twin Rovers were designed to last for 3 months, instead they have lasted more than six years and are still going after over 8 years. The pattern of the tracks have been shown to change every few months. TA study that combined data from the High Resolution Stereo Camera (HRSC) and the Mars Orbiter Camera (MOC) found that some large dust devils on Mars have a diameter of 700 meters and last at least 26 minutes. The image below of Russel Crater shows changes in dust devil tracks over a period of only three months, as documented by HiRISE. Other Dust Devil Tracks are visible in the picture of Frento Vallis.

Craters
Impact craters generally have a rim with ejecta around them, in contrast volcanic craters usually do not have a rim or ejecta deposits.  As craters get larger (greater than 10 km in diameter) they usually have a central peak. The peak is caused by a rebound of the crater floor following the impact.  Sometimes craters will display layers.  Craters can show us what lies deep under the surface.

Sand Dunes
When there are perfect conditions for producing sand dunes, steady wind in one direction and just enough sand, a barchan sand dune forms. Barchans have a gentle slope on the wind side and a much steeper slope on the lee side where horns or a notch often forms.  One picture below shows a definite barchan.

Gullies

Gullies on steep slopes are found in certain regions of Mars.  Many ideas have been advanced to explain them.  Formation by running water when the climate was different is a popular idea.  Recently, because changes in gullies have been seen since HiRISE has been orbiting Mars, it is thought that they may be formed by chunks of dry ice moving down slope during spring time.  Gullies are one of the most interesting discoveries made by orbiting space craft.

Hellas floor features
The Hellas floor contains some strange-looking features.  One of these features is called "banded terrain."  This terrain has also been called "taffy pull" terrain, and it lies near honeycomb terrain, another strange surface.  Banded terrain is found in the north-western part of the Hellas basin.  This section of the Hellas basin is the deepest.  The banded-terrain deposit displays an alternation of narrow band shapes and inter-bands.  The sinuous nature and relatively smooth surface texture suggesting a viscous flow origin.  A study published in Planetary and Space Science found that this terrain was the youngest deposit of the interior of Hellas.  They also suggest in the paper that banded terrain may have covered a larger area of the NW interior of Hellas.  The bands can be classified as linear, concentric, or lobate.  Bands are typically 3–15 km long, 3 km wide.  Narrow inter-band depressions are 65 m wide and 10 m deep.  Pictures of these features can look like abstract art.

Gullies on Dunes
Gullies are found on some dunes.  These are somewhat different from gullies in other places, like the walls of craters.  Gullies on dunes seem to keep the same width for a long distance and often just end with a pit, instead of an apron.  Many of these gullies are found on dunes in Russell (Martian crater).

Channels

Other scenes from Noachis quadrangle

Other Mars Quadrangles

Interactive Mars map

See also

 Barchan
 Climate of Mars
 Geology of Mars
 Groundwater on Mars
 HiRISE
 Hydrothermal circulation
 Impact crater
 List of craters on Mars
 List of quadrangles on Mars
 Martian gullies
 MOC Public Targeting Program
 Ore genesis
 Ore resources on Mars
 Polygonal patterned ground
 Planetary nomenclature
 Scalloped topography
 Water on Mars

References

External links 

  Banded Flow Terrain in Hellas Basin